Capsticks is a law firm founded by Brian Capstick based in South London.  Not to be confused with  Capstick's Law, a TV series.  It specialises in health work.

5 partners from DAC Beachcroft's office in Leeds moved to the firm in 2013. 

It has been involved in the investigation of various scandals in the NHS, such as that into failings at Liverpool Community Health NHS Trust and into problems in GP practices. It is a member of the North of England Commercial Procurement Collaborative.  It provides legal advice to General Practices.  It has been suggested that conflicts of interest may cause problems because of its multiple roles in the NHS.

It runs a Risk Barometer with the Health Service Journal.

It is expected to secure an exclusive contract for prosecution work with the Solicitors Regulation Authority.  It is on the Crown Commercial Service panel for general legal advice services.

It is the legal adviser to NHS Employers. 

In May 2022 it wrote off training course loans to trainees and handed out pay increases after profits increased from £8.5 million to £10 million during the pandemic.

References

Law firms based in London